Dr. Dogganal Mahadevappa Nanjundappa (Dr. D. M. Nanjundappa) (died 2005) was an Indian economist from Karnataka and a professor of economics at Karnataka University, Dharwad. He served as the Vice-chancellor of the Bangalore University from 1987 and the Karnataka University. Professor Nanjundappa was deputy chair of the Karnataka State Planning Board. He was well known for his "Report of the High Power Committee for Redressal of Regional Imbalances in Karnataka"

He died on Monday, 26 September 2005 at Bangalore and was buried with State honours at his native place Dogganal, in Holalkere Taluk of Chitradurga District.

External links
 D.M. Nanjundappa laid to rest at Dogganal with State honours
 Institute for Social and Economic Change
 Readings in Indian Railway Finance
     Department of Economics, Karnataka University, Dharwar
     Report on Regional Imbalance
 

2005 deaths
20th-century Indian economists
People from Chitradurga
Scientists from Karnataka
1929 births